Mahajanga was a former province of Madagascar that had an area of 150,023 km². It had a population of 1,896,000 (2004).  Its capital was Mahajanga,  the second largest city in Madagascar.

Except for Fianarantsoa, Mahajanga Province bordered all of the country's other provinces–Antsiranana in the north, Toamasina in the east, Antananarivo in the southeast and Toliara in the southwest. Sea cucumbers were an important commercial product produced in the province.

In 1999, cholera epidemic broke out in the province. It infected 380 people and claimed 26 lives. The epidemic spread towards the southern Antananarivo and Toliara provinces. The province was hit by Cyclone Kamisy in June 1984. A large percentage of the province's population lived below the poverty line.

A large area of the province was covered by rain forests. It had a rich variety of flora and fauna. Several lemur species were endemic to the province. Assassin spiders were discovered in the province's Bay of Baly National Park. Another important national park is Ankarafantsika National Park. The national parks attract many tourists and served as an important economic advantage to the province. A Natural Science Center was created in Mahajanga in 1985.

Rice, cotton, tobacco and manioc were the important agricultural products. The province offerd limited opportunities for higher and technical education. The health related facilities are limited. Anemia in children was common and the province offered poor transportation and security related facilities.

Abolition
The provinces were abolished following the results of Malagasy constitutional referendum, 2007 which led to the formation of 22 smaller areas (faritra or regions) to facilitate regional development.

Administrative divisions 

Mahajanga Province was divided into four regions - Betsiboka, Boeny, Melaky and Sofia. These four regions became the first-level administrative divisions when the provinces were abolished in 2009. They are subdivided into 21 districts:

 Betsiboka region:
 10. Kandreho District (Kandreho)
 11. Maevatanana District (Maevatanana)
 21. Tsaratanana District (Tsaratanana)
 Boeny region:
  1. Ambatoboeny District (Ambatoboeny)
 12. Mahajanga II
 13. Mahajanga
 17. Marovoay District (Marovoay)
 18. Mitsinjo District (Mitsinjo)
 20. Soalala District (Soalala)
 Melaky region:
  2. Ambatomainty District (Ambatomainty)
  4. Antsalova District (Antsalova)
  8. Besalampy District (Besalampy)
 14. Maintirano District (Maintirano)
 19. Morafenobe District (Morafenobe)
 Sofia region:
  3. Analalava District (Analalava)
  5. Antsohihy District (Antsohihy)
  6. Bealanana District (Bealanana)
  7. Befandriana-Nord District (Befandriana-Nord)
  9. Boriziny District (Boriziny)
 15. Mampikony District (Mampikony)
 16. Mandritsara District (Mandritsara)

References

Bibliography 

 
 
 
 
 
 
 
 
 
 
 
 

 
Provinces of Madagascar